Samal-e Jonubi (also Romanized as Samal-e Jonūbī) is a village in Ahram Rural District, in the Central District of Tangestan County, Bushehr Province, Iran. At the 2006 census, its population was 1,067, in 271 families.

References 

Populated places in Tangestan County